Nunnanlahden Uuni Oy is a Finnish public limited company originating from Nunnanlahti in Northern Karelia. The company's main office is located at Juuka, a town near the city of Joensuu in Northeastern Finland. The  subsidiary is NunnaUuni Oy. NunnaUuni Oy is known for its heat-preserving NunnaUuni fireplaces that the company produces from its own deposit of MammuttiStone, a soapstone material that has proved an excellent material for fireplaces.

Nunnanlahden Uuni Oy was founded in 1982 and the company began industrial production of heat-preserving fireplaces during the same year. At the beginning of 2007, the company handed over its production, sales and marketing functions to its subsidiary company, NunnaUuni Oy. At the moment, NunnaUuni Oy is the largest privately owned company in its field in Finland. The company has participated in numerous co-operational research projects and it also conducts research and product development on its own. Due to its research and product development efforts, the company has approximately 60 registered patents and 100 product models registered for protection.

Company history 
Nunnanlahden Uuni Oy was founded 25 years ago on the 5th of August, 1982. The company started its industrial production in a small 70 square-metre garage and had 4 employees in addition to its founder and CEO, Juhani Lehikoinen. In 25 years, the company has grown to one of the most successful companies operating in Finland.

Juha Lehikoinen's father Tahvo was a second generation fireplace-maker and worked at the Nunnanlahti soapstone site for nearly 40 years. He had expert knowledge about soapstone and its various characteristics and knew the Nunnanlahti soapstone site as well as anyone in the region.

The company 
At the beginning of 2007, NunnaUuni Oy had 240 employees. The company's total revenue is approximately 26 million euros per year. More than half of this revenue comes from export sales. The company exports its products mainly to German-speaking regions of Central Europe.

NunnaUuni Oy has sales partners in 15 different countries. The company has 150 licensed resellers in Finland in addition to its network of over 30 NunnaUuni-licensed fireplace-makers. Altogether the company has approximately 500 licensed resellers internationally and domestically.

Products 
Over the years, Nunnanlahden Uuni Oy has actively promoted research in its field of business. The company has used these research results in its product development processes, while giving special attention to sustainable development practices by focusing on the needs of customers and environmental issues.

The company's traditional fireplace products, NunnaUuni fireplaces, are built from MammuttiStone soapstone and the fireplaces are produced by employing the Golden Fire clean burning process and recent innovations in product development. These practices have helped the company to produce products that combine enhanced heat-preservation qualities with smaller size and total mass weight of fireplace products. Such product enhancements are especially beneficial for clients who want to use their living spaces more efficiently and are looking for a heat-preserving but small fireplace for their home. The new form factor of fireplaces suits modern living spaces in both its measurements and heat production qualities.

Significant events in company history 
1982
 Juhani Lehikoinen founded Nunnalahden Uuni Oy at Nunnanlahti in Juuka..
1986
 The company began its sales exports and a product development project that aimed to produce a clean process for burning.
1993
 The company started a research project in co-operation with University of Oulu that aimed to analyze the characteristics and heat properties of soapstone.
1998
 The clean burning product development project was finished. The burning process produced in the project was named Golden Fire (EP 1008808).
2006
 The company's total revenue rose to 26.7 million euros.
2007
 The company's employee count rose to 255 employees.

Sources 
 NunnaUuni Oy's website

Manufacturing companies of Finland